Reichenau Island is an island in Lake Constance in Southern Germany. It lies almost due west of the city of Konstanz, between the Gnadensee and the Untersee, two parts of Lake Constance.

A low road bridge allows the passage of ordinary boats but not of sailing-boats.

In 724, the first monastery was built on the island by the bishop Pirmin, and Reichenau quickly developed into an influential religious, cultural, and intellectual center. During the Early and High Middle Ages, the Reichenau Abbey was one of the significant monasteries across the Frankish Empire. Because of its historical importance and the exceptional quality of the architecture and artwork found in the island's three churches and abbey, Reichenau was declared a World Heritage Site in 2000.

History
Although people occupied Reichenau in the Bronze Age and Iron Age, archeological evidence suggests that Reichenau was abandoned during the Roman era. Uninhabited until 724, when Saint Pirmin received support from the Carolingian ruler Charles Martel to build a monastery on the island. The first abbey, at Mittelzel, was wooden, although it was replaced by a stone building by 746. In the early 9th century, under the patronage of the Carolingian dynasty and Ottonian dynasty, the monastery flourished. In 816 the abbey was rebuilt in a cruciform basilica style, churches dedicated to the Virgin and Saint Mark were consecrated. Relics of St. Mark arrived at the abbey in the mid-9th century. Two further churches were built on the island consecrated to Saints Peter and Paul (in 799) and to Saint George (in 896). 

The abbey's bailiff was housed in a two-storey stone building to which two more storeys of timber framing were added in the 14th century, one of the oldest timber-frame buildings in south Germany. It is today used as a museum of local history.

In addition to being a religious center, Reichenau attracted influential poets and authors such as Walafrid Strabo (who served as abbot) and scientists and scholars such as Hermann of Reichenau and artists. The famous artworks of Reichenau include (in the church of St George) the Ottonian murals of miracles of Christ, unique survivals from the 10th century. The Plan of St. Gall, the only surviving architectural drawing in the Middle Ages, may also have been created on the island.  Among the Abbey's far-flung landholdings was Reichenau, a village on the upper Rhine in the municipality of Tamins in the canton of Graubünden, Switzerland, named for the Abbey.

In the 16th century, the Prince-Bishopric of Constance was extended to include Reichenau, and as a result the influence of the monastery waned. During the secularization of the Prince-Bishopric of Constance in 1803, many of the smaller chapels on the island were demolished. In addition, the manuscripts and archives held in the abbey were given to Karlsruhe and the University of Heidelberg library and the surrounding farms were parceled and sold.

Today the island is also famous for its vegetable farms. The Wollmatinger Ried next to the island is a large nature reserve, a wetland area of reeds which is used by many birds as a stopover during their annual migration.

Gallery

Notes

References

External links

Monastic Island of Reichenau UNESCO Official Website

Reichenau: monastic island
 History and images
Reichenau Abbey Church

 3 spherical panoramas of St. Georg Church
 Saint George in Overzell in Circulo Romanico page
 Abacial de Santa Maria y San Marcos in Circulo Romanico page
 Iglesia de San Pedro y san Pablo in Circulo Romanico

Lake islands of Germany
World Heritage Sites in Germany
Konstanz (district)
Islands of Lake Constance in Germany
Islands of Baden-Württemberg
Cultural landscapes of Germany